Epiperipatus imthurni is a species of velvet worm in the family Peripatidae. This species ranges from light orange or yellowish brown to a dark brown on its dorsal surface; the ventral surface is a lighter orangeish shade of the same color. The type locality is in Guyana. No males have been recorded from this species. Females can reach a large size, up to 2.25 g in weight, and range from 25 mm up to 96 mm in length. They have 29 to 32 pairs of legs, usually 30 or 31. Females from Trinidad were shown to reproduce via parthenogenesis; the only velvet worm known to do so.

References

Onychophorans of tropical America
Onychophoran species
Animals described in 1888
Unisexual animals